Mohammad Haziq Mu'iz bin Abdul (born 24 December 1996) is a Malaysian footballer who plays for Malaysia  Super League side Kuala Lumpur as a midfielder.

References

External links
 

1994 births
Living people
Malaysian footballers
Malaysia Super League players
Malaysia Premier League players
Felcra FC players
Kuala Lumpur City F.C. players
Association football midfielders